Typhoon Yutu, known in the Philippines as Super Typhoon Rosita, was an extremely powerful tropical cyclone that caused catastrophic destruction on the islands of Tinian and Saipan in the Northern Mariana Islands, and later impacted the Philippines. It is the strongest typhoon ever recorded to impact the Mariana Islands, and is tied as the second-strongest tropical cyclone to strike the United States and its unincorporated territories by both wind speed and barometric pressure. It also tied Typhoon Kong-rey as the most powerful tropical cyclone worldwide in 2018. The fortieth tropical depression, twenty-sixth named storm, twelfth typhoon, and the seventh super typhoon of the 2018 Pacific typhoon season, Yutu originated from a low-pressure area that formed in the western Pacific Ocean on October 15. The disturbance organized into a tropical depression on the same day, as ocean sea-surface heat content increased. Shortly after becoming a tropical depression, the Joint Typhoon Warning Center (JTWC) assigned the system the identifier 31W. The system continued to strengthen, becoming a tropical storm several hours later, with the Japan Meteorological Agency (JMA) naming the system Yutu. Increasingly favorable conditions allowed Yutu to explosively intensify, as the system maintained deep convection and subsequently became a severe tropical storm and then a typhoon.

Through October 23, Yutu continued to explosively intensify, quickly reaching Category 5 super typhoon intensity on October 24. This made it the most powerful tropical cyclone to make landfall worldwide in 2018. Immediately after making landfall, Yutu underwent an eyewall replacement cycle, causing it to momentarily weaken as it completed the process. Maintaining super typhoon status, Yutu continued to move westward towards the Philippines, entering the Philippine Area of Responsibility (PAR) whereupon it was assigned the local name Rosita. Intrusions of dry air and lower sea surface temperatures, however, caused Yutu to weaken significantly through October 28, though it remained a strong typhoon. The JTWC estimated 1-minute winds to be  at that time.

The storm wrought catastrophic damage across Tinian and Saipan, destroying numerous homes and killing two people. Violent winds destroyed concrete structures in southern Saipan and stripped areas of vegetation. In the Philippines, landslides and flooding killed at least 27 people, while in Hong Kong, one person was killed by high surf.

Meteorological history

Early on October 21, 2018, a tropical depression developed to the east of Guam and the Northern Mariana Islands, with the JMA initiating advisories on the system. Shortly afterward, the JTWC assigned the storm the identifier 31W. The system began to strengthen, becoming a tropical storm several hours later, and the JMA assigned the name Yutu to the storm. Favorable conditions, including low wind shear and high ocean-surface temperatures, allowed Yutu to explosively intensify on the following day, with the storm reaching severe tropical storm strength and then typhoon intensity a few hours later. From October 23 to 24, Yutu continued to organize and explosively intensify, reaching Category 5 super typhoon intensity on October 24. The typhoon continued to strengthen and displayed a healthy convective structure, while moving towards the island of Saipan.

On October 25, the system underwent an eyewall replacement cycle, causing it to weaken into a Category 4 super typhoon as it continued moving westwards. On the next day, Yutu completed its eyewall replacement cycle, and the system regained Category 5 intensity at 12:00 UTC that day. On October 27, Yutu resumed weakening, and weakened into a Category 4 super typhoon. On the same day, Yutu entered PAGASA's Philippine Area of Responsibility (or PAR), and was named Rosita. Yutu continued to weaken while progressing westward, after encountering more unfavorable conditions, including lower sea surface temperatures, and the storm weakened to a Category 3-equivalent typhoon on October 28. At around 21:00 UTC on October 29, Yutu made landfall as a Category 2-equivalent typhoon on the Philippine province of Isabela, on the island of Luzon.

As Yutu entered the South China Sea, it was exposed to the cold and dry air of the northeastern monsoon from China and further weakened into a tropical depression. Late on November 1, Yutu turned towards the south-southwest while rapidly weakening, due to wind shear. On November 2, Yutu degenerated into a remnant low without making another landfall, before dissipating early on the next day.

Preparations

Northern Mariana Islands
In the month prior to Yutu, Typhoon Mangkhut struck the Mariana Islands, prompting emergency officials to stockpile supplies. With relief supplies largely unused, storage facilities on Guam had 220,000 liters of water and 260,000 meals readily available. Federal Emergency Management Agency (FEMA) personnel deployed to both Tinian and Saipan ahead of the storm. U.S. President Donald Trump declared an emergency for the Northern Islands on October 24.

Philippines
On October 25, PAGASA began issuing severe weather bulletins in anticipation of Typhoon Yutu entering the Philippine Area of Responsibility. The agency subsequently raised Public Storm Warning Signal (PSWS) No. 1 for the majority of Luzon north of Metro Manila on October 28. Following a slightly more southerly track than initially anticipated, PSWS No. 1 later extended to Quezon. Furthermore, PSWS No. 2, indicating tropical storm-force winds, covered large swaths of northern Luzon.

More than 10,000 people, still reeling from the devastating effects of Typhoon Mangkhut in September, evacuated the mountainous areas in northern provinces of Luzon.

Highest Public Storm Warning Signal

Hong Kong
On November 1, Hong Kong Observatory issued the Strong Wind Signal No. 3, the first time Strong Wind Signal No. 3 has been issued in November since Typhoon Ira in 1993.

Impact

Northern Mariana Islands

Striking Tinian and Saipan on October 24 as a Category 5-equivalent super typhoon, Yutu became the strongest tropical cyclone to ever impact the Mariana Islands and the second-strongest to strike the United States or its territories as a whole, tied with Typhoon Karen in 1962 and Hurricane Camille in 1969. Only the 1935 Labor Day hurricane impacted the country at a greater strength. Yutu's eyewall also knocked out Saipan's doppler radar on October 25, during the storm's landfall.

On Saipan, the typhoon killed two people; a woman when it wrecked the building she was staying in, and another woman who died of carbon monoxide poisoning caused by inhaling the fumes of a generator. At least 133 other people were left injured, three of whom were injured severely. The entirety of both islands were left without electricity. The majority of buildings in southern Saipan lost their roofs or were destroyed, including Hopwood Middle School, which suffered extensive damage. Low-lying vegetation in southern parts of the island were shredded or ripped from the ground. Saipan International Airport sustained significant damage; terminals flooded and navigation aids were rendered inoperable.

The majority of homes on Tinian were severely damaged or destroyed. Some concrete structures sustained significant damage, with a few completely destroyed, and residents reported that those buildings shook during the typhoon. Storm shutters were torn from windows, leaving the interior of structures exposed to wind and water damage. In one instance, a door was ripped from a building and hurled  into a pigsty. The island's only health center sustained major damage; however, no patients were being treated at the time. Tinian International Airport suffered significant damage. Total damage estimated by FEMA reached $800 million.

Meteorologist Brandon Aydlett at the National Weather Service described the typhoon as "the storm which sets the scale for which future storms are compared to".

Philippines

Striking Luzon on October 30, Typhoon Yutu, which was known in the Philippines as Typhoon “Rosita”,  produced torrential rain across the mountainous region. Numerous landslides caused significant damage, engulfing homes and blocking roads. Yutu killed a total of 27 people in the Philippines. Five people died after landslides occurred in Banaue and Lubuagan, while flooding claimed one life in Perez. A landslide in Natonin buried a government building, leaving 14 dead. Significant effects were felt in Benguet, La Union, and Nueva Vizcaya, where more than 100 people died during Typhoon Mangkhut in September. As of November 8, 2018, agricultural damage were counted to be ₱2.9 billion (US$54.1 million).

Hong Kong
On October 31, a 25-year-old man died when surfing in Big Wave Bay, Hong Kong Island, due to high surf, while the standby typhoon signal No. 1 was hoisted.

Aftermath

Before the typhoon's impact, Governor Ralph Torres requested for a presidential emergency declaration in anticipation of the typhoon's projected devastation. U.S. President Donald J. Trump quickly approved his request on October 23, 2018. Immediately after the typhoon's impact, Governor Torres requested for a presidential disaster declaration, which was approved on October 26 by President Trump. Immediately following the typhoon's impact, the Congressional Delegate for the Northern Mariana Islands, Gregorio Sablan, made a request for aid. With the scale of destruction far exceeding Typhoon Soudelor in 2015, power was not expected to be fully restored for months. President Trump signed a major disaster declaration on October 26, enabling the islands to receive federal funding.

Daytime operations at Saipan International Airport resumed by October 27; however, damaged navigation equipment prevented safe operation during the night. The Coast Guard reopened the port of Saipan on October 27, allowing vessels to travel in and out of it. FEMA and the Red Cross established five relief distribution sites on the island which began operations on October 28.

Response efforts 

FEMA scheduled aircraft to deliver relief supplies by October 26. In accordance with changes implemented after Hurricane Maria in 2017, the agency established specific task forces to handle smaller scale facets of the recovery: transportation, communications, food and water, and energy and fuel.

Emergency shelters quickly filled to capacity on both islands by October 25. The same day the U.S. Department of Health and Human Services declared a public health emergency for the affected areas and deployed 50 health personnel. The USCGC Sequoia and USCGC Kiska ported in Guam sailed for Saipan and Tinian, respectively, with relief supplies.

Direct Relief worked with Commonwealth Healthcare Corporation and with other health facilities damaged by the storm to coordinate medical aid shipments to the Northern Mariana Islands. A shipment of 40,000 liters of drinking water along with other essential items was delivered in late October.

On October 26, Matson, Inc. provided $125,000 in funds and deployed its vessel Mana loaded with bottled water and ice.

On October 27, South Korea began airlifting approximately 1,000 stranded tourists from Saipan.

Retirement 
Due to the severe damage in the Northern Mariana Islands, the name Yutu was retired during the 52nd annual session of the ESCAP/WMO Typhoon Committee in February 2020. In February 2021, the Typhoon Committee subsequently chose Yinxing as its replacement name.

In addition PAGASA officially retired Rosita from the rotating lists of tropical cyclone names within the Philippine Area of Responsibility, and replaced it with Rosal after the typhoon caused over ₱1 billion in damage on its onslaught in the country, and was used for the first time in 2022.

See also

Weather of 2018
Tropical cyclones in 2018
Typhoon Karen
Typhoon Lynn (1987)
Typhoon Nina (1987)
Typhoon Megi (2010)
Typhoon Krosa (2013)
Typhoon Mangkhut – affected the Mariana Islands and northern Luzon less than two months earlier, causing extensive damage.
Typhoon Soudelor
Typhoon Hagibis

References

External links

JMA General Information of Typhoon Yutu (1826) from Digital Typhoon

31W.YUTU from the U.S. Naval Research Laboratory

2018 natural disasters
Yutu
2018 in Guam
2018 in the Northern Mariana Islands
2018 in the Philippines
Yutu
Yutu
October 2018 events in Oceania
October 2018 events in the Philippines
November 2018 events in Asia
Yutu